The 2018–19 Brisbane Heat Women's season was the fourth in the team's history. Coached by Peter McGiffin and captained by Kirby Short, the Heat finished third on the WBBL04 ladder and qualified for the playoffs. In an "incredible" semi-final notable for a catch taken by Haidee Birkett on the last ball of the game, they defeated the Sydney Thunder to progress to their first championship decider appearance. In the final against the double-defending champions, the Sydney Sixers, Player of the Match Beth Mooney led an upset victory to secure Brisbane's maiden WBBL title.

Squad 
Each 2018–19 squad featured 15 active players, with an allowance of up to five marquee signings including a maximum of three from overseas. Under a new rule, Australian marquees were classed as players who held a national women's team contract at the time of signing on for their WBBL|04 team.

Personnel changes ahead of the season included:
 Holly Ferling, the Heat's first-ever player signing, departed the team and joined the Melbourne Stars.
 Barbadian marquee Deandra Dottin was not re-signed for another season.
 The resulting vacant marquee position was filled by South Africa's Suné Luus.
 Local teenage players Josie Dooley, Charli Knott and Courtney Sippel were added to the roster.

The table below lists the Heat players and their key stats (including runs scored, batting strike rate, wickets taken, economy rate, catches and stumpings) for the season.

Ladder

Fixtures 
All times are local time

Regular season 

Responding to the Sydney Thunder's first innings total of 7/171, Heat opener Beth Mooney recorded her maiden WBBL century but was then dismissed in the 17th over. With Brisbane still requiring 19 runs off the last twelve balls, Harmanpreet Kaur—having already claimed two wickets, including the stumping of Mooney, for just ten runs—came on to bowl her third over. The Heat, primarily through Delissa Kimmince, scored 13 runs off the over to swing the momentum once more. Laura Harris then hit the winning runs against the bowling of Nicola Carey with three wickets in hand and three balls remaining, making it Brisbane's highest successful run chase. The result helped to set up a semi-final encounter between the two teams on the following weekend.

Knockout phase 

The lower-ranked Heat posted a first innings total of 7/140, recovering from 5/78 after 12 overs through an unbeaten knock of 32 from 25 by Laura Harris. After struggling through the middle overs of the run chase, a late charge by the Sydney Thunder brought the hosts back into the contest to leave a required five runs off the final delivery for victory. The last ball, sent down by spinner Jess Jonassen, was struck flat and cleanly to deep square leg by batter Nicola Carey. Jonassen immediately signalled disappointment as the ball set sail for beyond the boundary rope, therefore scoring six runs and clinching the match for Sydney... However, Brisbane fielder Haidee Birkett made enough ground in time to take a "miracle" catch just inside the field of play to knock the Thunder out of the tournament. The match, in conjunction with the other semi-final played later in the day, was hailed as a showcase of "the irrefutable rise of women's cricket" and "sport with drama, skill and unpredictability – a potent recipe for success".

In front of the league's first-ever sellout crowd, the visiting Heat pulled off an upset victory to win their maiden championship and deny a Sydney Sixers three-peat. Requiring 34 runs with 36 balls remaining, Brisbane looked to be in control of the chase until the 15th over when Sydney leg spinner Dane van Niekerk struck twice—including the removal of linchpin Beth Mooney for 65 through a forward-diving catch by Ellyse Perry in the outfield. Although the Heat would continue to lose wickets, Laura Harris did enough to steady the ship, eventually hitting the winning runs with three wickets and four deliveries to spare. Player of the Final Mooney, who had been receiving on-field medical treatment for the flu and heat stroke, revealed in a post-match interview that her ongoing game delays instigated sledging from several opponents: "It was kind of nice to know while I wasn't feeling well, I was going well enough to piss them off and they were getting frustrated at how long I was taking to face up... I've played enough cricket against (the Sixers) to know what gets under their skin and we definitely won that battle."

Statistics and awards 
 Most runs: Beth Mooney – 486 (3rd in the league)
 Highest score in an innings: Beth Mooney – 102 (55) vs Sydney Thunder, 12 January 2019
 Most wickets: Delissa Kimmince – 22 (equal 1st in the league)
 Best bowling figures in an innings: Delissa Kimmince – 4/18 (3.5 overs) vs Melbourne Stars, 10 January 2019
 Most catches: Grace Harris, Kirby Short – 9 each (equal 2nd in the league)
 Player of the Match awards:
 Sammy-Jo Johnson – 4
 Grace Harris, Beth Mooney – 2 each
 Haidee Birkett, Josie Dooley – 1 each
 Heat Most Valuable Player: Sammy-Jo Johnson
 WBBL|04 Player of the Tournament: Grace Harris (3rd), Sammy-Jo Johnson (equal 4th)
 WBBL|04 Team of the Tournament: Grace Harris, Sammy-Jo Johnson, Delissa Kimmince
 Player of the Final: Beth Mooney

References 

2018–19 Women's Big Bash League season by team
Brisbane Heat (WBBL)